The Battle of Modon was fought on 7 October 1403 between the fleets of the Republic of Venice and of the Republic of Genoa, then under French control, commanded by the French marshal Jean Le Maingre, better known as Boucicaut. One of the last clashes in the Venetian–Genoese wars, the battle ended in a decisive Venetian victory.

Background

Tensions between the Republic of Venice and its old rival, the Republic of Genoa, rose again in 1402, as reports came in of Genoese pirates attacking Venetian merchant shipping. The Venetians authorised the captain-general of the Sea, Carlo Zeno, to mobilise the fleet and take measures to combat Genoese piracy. 

In April 1403, a Genoese fleet of nine galleys, seven round ships, a galleass, and a horse transport, had sailed from Genoa under the command of the French Marshal Boucicaut, and made for Cyprus, to strengthen Genoese influence there. On its way, the fleet passed by the Venetian outpost of Modon in southwestern Greece, but no hostilities took place, and Boucicaut led his fleet on to Cyprus. After carrying out his mission there, the French commander, a "fervent crusader", launched attacks on Muslim cities on the Levantine coast. Among others, Beirut was sacked, an event which angered the Venetians further since most of the booty the Genoese took there actually belonged to Venetian merchants. In September, Boucicaut, at the head of eleven galleys and two transport cogs, set sail for the return journey.

Battle
The Genoese fleet arrived at Modon on 4 October, only to find a Venetian fleet of eleven galleys and two round ships waiting for them. Anticipating a battle, Zeno moved his ships out into the bay, while the Genoese anchored at the offshore island of Sapienza. In the early morning of 7 October the Genoese started to sail north, but were pursued by the Venetians. The ensuing battle was hard-fought, particularly between the flagships of the two opposing fleets, which closed on one another and engaged in  hand-to-hand combat. The battle was decided by the Venetian round ship Pisana, which captured three Genoese galleys, leading Boucicaut to break off and retreat. The Genoese had 600 casualties, and a further 300 as prisoners of war aboard the three captured vessels, while the Venetians had suffered only 153 wounded.

Aftermath
The internal instability of Genoa meant that this was the last major challenge offered by the Genoese to Venetian maritime hegemony and its dominance of the eastern trade routes. The latter would be soon shaken, however, by the inexorable rise of the Ottoman Empire.

References

Bibliography
 
 

1403 in Europe
15th century in the Republic of Genoa
15th century in the Republic of Venice
Modon 1403
Battles in the Peloponnese
Conflicts in 1403
Medieval Messenia